Malangi is a 1965 Pakistani biographical and musical film directed by Rashid Akhtar and produced by Chaudhry Mohammad Aslam. Film starring actor Akmal, Shirin, Yousuf Khan, and Talish. This was a 'Golden Jubilee' film of 1965 and had super-hit film songs by the music director Master Abdullah.</ref>

Cast 

 Akmal as (Malangi), the film's title role
 Yousuf Khan
 Shirin
 Firdous
 Mazhar Shah as (Harnama)
 Sawan
 Fazal Haq
 M. Ajmal
 Sheikh Iqbal
 Talish
 Zeenat Begum
 Sikkedar
 Aslam Pervaiz (Guest appearance)
 Amin Malik (Guest appearance)
 Mohammad Ali (Guest appearance)
 Chham Chham
 Zumurrud
 Rangeela
 Gulshan
 Munawar Zarif
 Zulfi
 Khalifa Nazir
 Chun Chun
 Kamala Chaudhry
 Gotam
 A Khan
 Abu Shah
 Zia

Soundtrack 

.

The score and soundtrack for Malangi were composed by Master Abdullah. Rashid Akhtar had worked on eight films with Master Abdullah and developed a rapport with him. The lyrics were by Hazin Qadri. The soundtrack consists of 8 songs and features vocals by

 Noor Jehan
 Mala
 Nazir Begum
 Irene Perveen
 Masood Rana
 Munawar Zarif
 Master Abdullah

Track listing

References

External links 
 

1965 films
Films set in the British Raj
Pakistani biographical films
Pakistani crime films
1965 musical films
Punjabi-language Pakistani films
Pakistani musical films